Julia (104 – after 39 BC) was the mother of the triumvir general Mark Antony.

Biography

Early life
She was the daughter of Lucius Julius Caesar (the consul of 90 BC) and Fulvia. She and her brother Lucius Julius Caesar (who was consul in 64 BC) were born and raised in Rome. 

Julia was a third-cousin of Julius Caesar (their great-great-grandparents Gaius and Sextus Julius Caesar were siblings).

Marriages
Julia married Marcus Antonius Creticus, a man of a senatorial family. Their sons were the triumvir Mark Antony, Gaius Antonius and Lucius Antonius. Because of their kinship through her, Gaius Julius Caesar was obliged to promote the political careers of her sons, despite his distaste for their father and his generally low opinion of their abilities. After Julia's first husband died in 74 BC, she married Publius Cornelius Lentulus Sura, a politician who in 63 BC was involved in the Catilinarian conspiracy and was executed on the orders of Cicero.

Julia had raised her sons through her marriages. Plutarch describes her as one the of "most nobly born and admirable women of her time". The following clause from Plutarch describes her relationship with her first husband:

Later life
Elsewhere Plutarch illustrates her character with an episode from the proscription of 43 BC, during the Second Triumvirate:

During the Perusine War (modern Perugia) between 41 BC-40 BC, Julia left Rome, although Octavian (future Roman Emperor Augustus) treated her with kindness. She never trusted Sextus Pompeius. When Sextus Pompeius was in Sicily, Julia had sent to Greece for Antony, a distinguished escort and convoy of triremes. After the reconciliation of the triumvirs, Julia returned with Antony to Italy in 39 BC and was probably present at the meeting with Sextus Pompeius at Misenum.

See also
 List of Roman women

References

Sources 
 Plutarch's biography of Antony (from the Parallel Lives)
 William Smith (ed., 1849). "Julia (2)" Dictionary of Greek and Roman Biography and Mythology. John Murray, London.

104 BC births
2nd-century BC Roman women
1st-century BC Roman women
1st-century BC Romans
Family of Mark Antony
Julii Caesares
Year of death missing